Speia is a genus of moths of the family Noctuidae.

Species
 Speia vuteria (Stoll, [1790])

References
Natural History Museum Lepidoptera genus database
Speia at funet

Hadeninae